Nick Fenton-Wells (born 11 August 1986) is a South African former rugby union footballer. He played as a Flanker for the Bristol Bears in Premiership Rugby, for Stormers in Super Rugby and Western Province in the Currie Cup and Vodacom Cup as well as previously representing the Ikey Tigers in the Varsity Cup.

He agreed to join Saracens in July 2012. On 7 May 2014, Fenton-Wells sign a permanent deal with RFU Championship side Bedford Blues after joining them on loan from Saracens.

In April 2016 he agreed to join Championship play off rivals Bristol for the 2016 season.

In December 2017 he played his first game for Bristol in his new position of Hooker, having transitioned from the back row.

References

External links

itsrugby.co.uk profile
Bristol Profile

Living people
1986 births
South African rugby union players
Stormers players
Western Province (rugby union) players
Rugby union flankers
Rugby union number eights
Rugby union players from Cape Town
White South African people
South African people of British descent
South African expatriate rugby union players
Expatriate rugby union players in England
South African expatriate sportspeople in England